Mehrab Hossain (born 12 April 1991) is a Bangladeshi cricketer. He made his List A debut on 12 November 2014, for Kalabagan Cricket Academy in the 2014–15 Dhaka Premier Division. He made his Twenty20 debut on 7 June 2021, for Partex Sporting Club in the 2021 Dhaka Premier Division Twenty20 Cricket League.

References

External links
 

1991 births
Living people
Bangladeshi cricketers
Partex Sporting Club cricketers
Place of birth missing (living people)